Khaled al-Bassam (Unaizah, Saudi Arabia, November 18, 1956 – 2015) was a Bahraini writer and historian. He has published many books on the history of Bahrain and the Persian Gulf region, including novels and biographies of artists and politicians.

Education
He studied English at Oxford University in the United Kingdom, then French immersion in Vichy, France.

Career
From 1984 to 1986, he served as Editor-in-Chief of the magazine, Gulf Panorama, followed by a brief stint in 1988 for Al-Hayat in London. From 1988 to 2000, he served as Deputy Editor-in-Chief of Al Ayam back home, owned by the same company as Gulf Panorama. From 2001 to 2005, he was Editor-in-Chief of the magazine, Hana Bahrain.

Publications

References

Bahraini novelists
Bahraini writers
1956 births
2015 deaths